The China-ASEAN CBO Basketball Invitational Tournament is an international basketball tournament held in Guangxi, China between teams from ASEAN and China. The first tournament was held in Pingguo County in the city of Bose from December 17-21, 2008. The Philippines won the inaugural tournament beating Guangxi in the finals. Home United of Singapore won bronze by beating Macau.

At the 2009 and 2010 edition of the tournament, the Misamis Oriental Meteors, which represented the Philippines emerged as champions by beating Guangxi in the finals for 2-consecutive times.

At the 2011 edition, Malaysia represented by the national team that they will send to the 2011 Southeast Asian Games emerged champions of the tournament by beating the Guangxi provincial team by 74–72. Singapore defeated Chinese Taipei for the bronze medal.

Results

Medal table

References

Basketball competitions in Asia between national teams
Sport in Guangxi
International basketball competitions hosted by China
Recurring sporting events established in 2008
Recurring sporting events disestablished in 2011
2008 establishments in China
2011 disestablishments in China